Natalie Louise Haynes (born 1974) is an English writer, broadcaster, classicist, and comedian.

Early life
Haynes was born in Birmingham, where she attended King Edward VI High School for Girls. She read Classics at Christ's College, Cambridge, and was also a member of Cambridge University Footlights Dramatic Club.

Radio
Haynes has been a panellist on Wordaholics, We've Been Here Before, Banter, Quote... Unquote, Personality Test, and Armando Iannucci's Charm Offensive on BBC Radio 4 and she has been an announcer on BBC Radio Four Extra.  She has contributed to BBC 7 comedy review show Serious About Comedy and reviews films for Front Row.

Her stand-up has been featured in Front Row and Loose Ends on BBC Radio 4 and Spanking New on BBC 7. She appeared in the BBC Radio 4 Pick of the Fringe in 2004 and 2005. She has also appeared on Radio Five Live's Anita Anand Show, and MacAulay and Co. on BBC Scotland.

In 2005 and 2006, Haynes wrote and presented documentaries on comic writers, for BBC Radio 4. Her subjects included the modern female writers Jessica Mitford and Dorothy Parker, and the classical male writers Aristophanes, Juvenal and Martial.

She appears as a critic on Saturday Review on BBC Radio 4.

On 4 February 2013, she was the star of the BBC Radio 4 programme With Great Pleasure. Her guests included the novelist Julian Barnes, who read from one of his own books.

BBC Radio 4 broadcast Natalie Haynes Stands up for the Classics, in which, aided by experts, she makes serious and amusing remarks about historical and mythological figures from ancient Greece and Rome, from Petronius to Sappho. There have been eight series, each containing four episodes of around half an hour. 

Series five, which was recorded in October–November 2019 and broadcast on Radio 4 from 23 December 2019, included programmes on Aristotle, Claudia Severa, Suetonius, and Homer's Iliad. Haynes' guests included Professor Edith Hall and Anita Anand. Series six was broadcast from 17 May 2020 and included episodes about  "Helen of Troy" and "Penthesilea, Amazon Warrior Queen", recorded with Professor Edith Hall. Series seven was broadcast from 8 May 2021 - 8 Jun 2021 and included programmes on Medusa, Pandora, Jocasta, and Clytemnestra.

Television
Haynes was a regular panellist on BBC's The Review Show and was the most-booked guest on More4's The Last Word. She appeared as a panellist on BBC 4's The Book Quiz, and on its Poetry Special alongside Andrew Motion and George Szirtes. She also appeared on Backlash, a BBC2 documentary on voluntary childlessness, wrote and performed in the STV/Assembly Television Best of the Fest in August 2005. Haynes has been a panellist on BBC Four's quiz show Mindgames, appeared on Must Try Harder on BBC Two in 2006 and was the art and literature expert on the BBC Two quiz show Knowitalls.

In August 2007, she appeared on BBC Four's The Book Quiz hosted by David Baddiel. On the programme she admitted researching a book on Wikipedia in order to bluff having read it.

In April 2008, Haynes was a member of the stand-up comedians' team on University Challenge: The Professionals. Her team lost to the Ministry of Justice, 100 points to 215. In November 2009, she appeared on BBC One's Question Time.

In February 2022, Haynes was announced as the new presenter of the online revival of Time Team, alongside Gus Casely-Hayford.

Journalism
Haynes has been a guest contributor for The Times since October 2006, and a regular contributor to New Humanist. She has also written for The Sunday Times Magazine, The Sunday Telegraph, The Big Issue, Loaded and The Independent.

Live shows
Haynes has toured (including Dublin, Berlin to Manhattan) and has performed five Edinburgh Fringe sell-out runs and national tours. She was nominated for the Best Newcomer Award at the 2002 Perrier Comedy Awards, the first woman to receive this nomination.

 2002 Six Degrees of Desolation (nominated for Perrier Award Best Newcomer)
 2003 Troubled Enough
 2004 Still Not Sorry
 2005 Run Or Die
 2006 Watching the Detectives

Haynes is the only comedian to have appeared at every Newbury Comedy Festival.

Books
Haynes contributed an essay to Serenity Found, a book about Joss Whedon's television show Firefly, edited by Jane Espenson, which was published in 2007 by BenBella Books. Her entries on subjects from Agatha Christie to E.F. Benson can be found in Cassell's Little Black Book of Books, published in 2007.

Her first children's novel, The Great Escape, was published by Simon & Schuster in September 2007. It won a PETA Proggy award, for best animal-friendly children's book, in 2008.

Haynes has written two non-fiction books. The Ancient Guide To Modern Life, on the subject of how living well in the present requires some recourse to the ancient world, was published by Profile Books in November 2010. Her most recent non-fiction book, Pandora's Jar: Women in the Greek Myths, was published by Picador in October 2020, and was a New York Times bestseller. Margaret Atwood called it "funny" and "sharp".

Haynes' first novel, Amber Fury (titled The Furies in the U.S.), was published in 2014. It was shortlisted for the Scottish Crime Book of the Year award. Her second novel, Children of Jocasta, a retelling of Antigone and Oedipus Rex, was published in 2017.

Haynes' third novel, A Thousand Ships (relating to the Trojan War), was published by Pan Macmillan on 4 May 2019. She discussed it on BBC Radio 4's Woman's Hour that month. A Thousand Ships was shortlisted for the Women's Prize for Fiction in 2020.

Haynes' fourth novel, Stone Blind, a retelling of the myth of Medusa, was published by Pan Macmillan on 15th September 2022, and an abridged version was read on BBC Radio 4 by Susannah Fielding.

Haynes was awarded the Classical Association Prize in 2015.

Bibliography 
 The Great Escape (Simon & Schuster, 2007)
 The Ancient Guide to Modern Life (Profile Books, 2010)
 Amber Fury (Corvus, 2014)
 The Children of Jocasta (Pan Macmillan, 2017)
 A Thousand Ships (Pan Macmillan, 2019)
 Pandora's Jar: Women in the Greek Myths (Pan Macmillan, 2020)
 Stone Blind (Pan Macmillan, September 2022)

References

External links
 Official site
 Haynes' page RCW literary agents

Alumni of Christ's College, Cambridge
21st-century English novelists
English women comedians
Comedians from Birmingham, West Midlands
Living people
1974 births
People educated at King Edward VI High School for Girls, Birmingham
20th-century English comedians
21st-century English comedians